Hino a Águas de São Pedro ("Hymn to Águas de São Pedro" or "Anthem to Águas de São Pedro") is the official anthem of the municipality of Águas de São Pedro, Brazil. Composed by Maria Magdalena Mauro Miranda, it was officialized by the municipal Law no. 553 of 24 November 1980.

Lyrics

References

External links

  Prefeitura de Águas de São Pedro The official website of Águas de São Pedro.
  Câmara da Estância de Águas de São Pedro Águas de São Pedro Municipal Council website.

Brazilian anthems
Regional songs
1980 songs